Avles is a village and a community of the municipality of Servia. The 2011 census recorded 293 inhabitants in the village.

References

Populated places in Kozani (regional unit)